Lloyd Tyrell-Kenyon, 4th Baron Kenyon, KCVO, TD (5 July 1864 – 30 November 1927), was a British peer and Conservative politician.

Family background and education
Born in Wilmore Crescent, west London, Kenyon was the son of the Hon. Lloyd Kenyon, son of Lloyd Kenyon, 3rd Baron Kenyon. He succeeded his grandfather as fourth Baron Kenyon in 1869. He was educated at Eton College and entered Christ Church, Oxford in 1882.

Political career
Lord Kenyon took his seat in the House of Lords on his 21st birthday in 1885.
In December 1900 he was appointed a Lord-in-waiting (government whip in the House of Lords) in the Conservative government of Lord Salisbury, a post he retained until 1905, the last three years under the leadership of Arthur Balfour.  He served the same post again, in the coalition Government of David Lloyd George, from 1916 to 1918.

He also took part in local politics for a period as member of Flintshire County Council, was a D.L. and J.P. for the county of Shropshire and J.P. for Flintshire county.

Other public services and honours
Apart from his political career he also served as Lord Lieutenant of Denbighshire from 1918 to his death.  He was Pro-Chancellor of the University of Wales from 1910 and President of the North Wales University College, as well as President of the National Museum of Wales from 1923.  In 1924 he became Chairman of the Agricultural Wages Board and the Milk Advisory Committee.

Lord Kenyon succeeded Stanley Leighton as treasurer of the Salop Infirmary in Shrewsbury in 1901. Tyrell-Kenyon was Lord-in-waiting to Queen Victoria, then also Edward VII between 1900–05, and then George V 1916-18.

Lord Kenyon was made KCVO in 1907 and was a Knight of Grace of the Order of St John of Jerusalem. He was also a Grand Cross of the Order of the Dannebrog of Denmark and the Order of the Crown of Italy.

Military service
Lord Kenyon served in the Shropshire Yeomanry, being promoted lieutenant in 1886, Captain in 1889, and Major on 14 December 1901. He was lieutenant-colonel commanding the regiment from 1907 to 1912. He was then promoted full colonel and made A.D.C. to King George V in 1912.

In the First World War he served at home as commanding officer of the 2/1st Welsh Horse Yeomanry from 1914 to 1916.

He was awarded the TD in 1909.

Family life and death
Lord Kenyon assumed by Royal licence the additional surname of Tyrell in 1912. He married Gwladys Julia Howard, daughter of Colonel Henry Richard Lloyd Howard, in 1916. He died at his home, Gredington Hall, Flintshire, of typhoid contracted from a mosquito bite, in November 1927, aged 63.  He was buried at the parish church of St Chad's, Hanmer. He was succeeded in his titles by his only son Lloyd. Lady Kenyon died in 1965.

References

Sources 
Kidd, Charles, Williamson, David (editors). Debrett's Peerage and Baronetage (1990 edition). New York: St Martin's Press, 1990, 

1864 births
1927 deaths
People educated at Eton College
Conservative Party (UK) Baronesses- and Lords-in-Waiting
Members of Flintshire County Council
Lord-Lieutenants of Denbighshire
Welsh Horse Yeomanry officers
Shropshire Yeomanry officers
Lloyd 4